Rumen Dimitrov (Bulgarian: Румен Димитров; born 19 September 1986) is a Bulgarian athlete specialising in the triple jump. He finished ninth at the 2014 European Championships and eighth at the 2015 European Indoor Championships.

His personal bests in the event are 16.87 metres outdoors (+1.7 m/s, Stara Zagora 2015) and 16.59 metres indoors (Bratislava 2016).

Competition record

References

1986 births
Living people
Bulgarian male triple jumpers
World Athletics Championships athletes for Bulgaria
Athletes (track and field) at the 2016 Summer Olympics
Olympic athletes of Bulgaria
Olympic male triple jumpers
21st-century Bulgarian people
20th-century Bulgarian people